Eugene Thacker is an American philosopher, poet, and author. He is Professor of Media Studies at The New School in New York City. His writing is often associated with the philosophy of nihilism and pessimism. Thacker's books include In the Dust of This Planet (part of his Horror of Philosophy trilogy) and Infinite Resignation.

Early life and education

Thacker was born and grew up in the Pacific Northwest. He received a Bachelor of Arts degree from the University of Washington, and a Master of Arts and Doctor of Philosophy in Comparative Literature from Rutgers University.

Works

Nihilism, pessimism, and speculative realism 

Thacker's work has been associated with philosophical nihilism and pessimism, as well as to contemporary philosophies of speculative realism and collapsology. His short book Cosmic Pessimism defines pessimism as "the philosophical form of disenchantment." As Thacker states: "Pessimism is the night-side of thought, a melodrama of the futility of the brain, a poetry written in the graveyard of philosophy."

In 2018, Thacker's new book, Infinite Resignation was published by Repeater Books. Infinite Resignation consists of fragments and aphorisms on the nature of pessimism, mixing the personal and philosophical. Thacker engages with writers like Thomas Bernhard, E.M. Cioran, Osamu Dazai, Søren Kierkegaard, Clarice Lispector, Giacomo Leopardi, Fernando Pessoa, and Schopenhauer. The New York Times noted "Thacker has thrown a party for all of these eloquent cranks in Infinite Resignation, and he is an excellent host...This book provides a metric ton of misery and a lot of company." One reviewer writes of the book: "Infinite Resignation belongs on the shelf next to the likes of Nietzsche and Schopenhauer...Like all great works of philosophy, this book will force readers to question their long-held beliefs in the way the world works and the way the world ought to work...Thacker's voice is quiet, a desperate whisper into the void that is both haunting and heartbreaking."

Thacker's major philosophical work is After Life, published by the University of Chicago Press. In it, Thacker argues that the ontology of life operates by way of a split between "Life" and "the living," making possible a "metaphysical displacement" in which life is thought via another metaphysical term, such as time, form, or spirit: "Every ontology of life thinks of life in terms of something-other-than-life...that something-other-than-life is most often a metaphysical concept, such as time and temporality, form and causality, or spirit and immanence" Thacker traces this theme in Aristotle, Dionysius the Areopagite, John Scottus Eriugena, negative theology, Immanuel Kant, and Georges Bataille, showing how this three-fold displacement is also alive in philosophy today. After Life also includes comparisons with Arabic, Japanese, and Chinese philosophy.

Thacker's follow-up essay "Darklife: Negation, Nothingness, and the Will-to-Life in Schopenhauer" discusses the ontology of life in terms of negation, eliminativism, and "the inverse relationship between logic and life." Specifically, Thacker argues that Schopenhauer's philosophy posits a "dark life" in opposition to the "ontology of generosity" of German Idealist thinkers such as Hegel and Schelling. Thacker has also written in a similar vein on the role of negation and "nothingness" in the work of mystical philosopher Meister Eckhart. Ultimately Thacker argues for a skepticism regarding "life": "Life is not only a problem of philosophy, but a problem for philosophy.

Horror and philosophy 

Thacker's most widely read book is In the Dust of This Planet, part of his Horror of Philosophy trilogy. In it, Thacker explores the idea of the "unthinkable world" as represented in the horror fiction genre, in philosophies of pessimism and nihilism, and in the philosophies of apophatic ("darkness") mysticism. In the first volume, In the Dust of This Planet, Thacker calls the horror of philosophy "the isolation of those moments in which philosophy reveals its own limitations and constraints, moments in which thinking enigmatically confronts the horizon of its own possibility." Thacker distinguishes the "world-for-us" (the human-centric view of the world), and the "world-in-itself" (the world as it exists objectively), from what he calls the "world-without-us": "the world-without-us lies somewhere in between, in a nebulous zone that is at once impersonal and horrific." In this and the other volumes of the trilogy Thacker writes about a wide range of work: H.P. Lovecraft, Algernon Blackwood, Edgar Allan Poe, Dante's Inferno, Les Chants de Maldoror by Comte de Lautréamont, the Faust myth, manga artist Junji Ito, contemporary horror authors Thomas Ligotti and Caitlín Kiernan, K-horror film, and the philosophy of Schopenhauer, Rudolph Otto, Medieval mysticism (Meister Eckhart, Angela of Foligno, John of the Cross), occult philosophy, and the philosophy of the Kyoto School.

Thacker's writing on philosophy and horror extends to what he calls dark media, or technologies that mediate between the natural and supernatural, and point to the limit of human perception and knowledge. Similarly, Thacker has written a series of essays on "necrology", defined as the decay or disintegration of the body politic. Thacker discusses plague, demonic possession, and the living dead, drawing upon the history of medicine, biopolitics, political theology, and the horror genre.

Philosophy, science, and technology 

Thacker's earlier works adopt approaches from the philosophies of science and technology, and examine the relation between science and science fiction. Examples are his book Biomedia, and his writings on bioinformatics, nanotechnology, biocomputing, complex adaptive systems, swarm intelligence, and network theory. Thacker's concept of biomedia is defined as follows: "Biomedia entail the informatic recontextualization of biological components and processes, for ends that may be medical or nonmedical...and with effects that are as much cultural, social, and political as they are scientific." Thacker clarifies: "biomedia continuously make the dual demand that information materialize itself...biomedia depend upon an understanding of biological as informational but not immaterial." In his book The Global Genome: Biotechnology, Politics, and Culture, Thacker looks to developments in tissue engineering where techno-mechanical apparatuses disappear altogether so that it appears as though technology is the natural body. In Thacker's words, "biotechnology is thus invisible yet immanent."

In 2013 Thacker, along with Alexander Galloway and McKenzie Wark, published the co-authored book Excommunication: Three Inquiries in Media and Mediation. In the opening of the book the authors ask "Does everything that exists, exist to be presented and represented, to be mediated and remediated, to be communicated and translated? There are mediative situations in which heresy, exile, or banishment carry the day, not repetition, communion, or integration. There are certain kinds of messages that state 'there will be no more messages'. Hence for every communication there is a correlative excommunication." This approach has been referred to as the "New York School of Media Theory."

Other writings 

Thacker's poetry and fiction has appeared in various literary anthologies and magazines. Thacker has produced book arts projects, and an anti-novel titled An Ideal for Living, of which American poet and conceptual writer Kenneth Goldsmith has said: "this an important book...these pages take cues from Burroughs and Gibson, while at the same time presciently pointing to the web-based path writing would take over the next decade." In the 1990s, Thacker, along with Ronald Sukenick and Mark Amerika, established Alt-X Press, for which he edited the anthology of experimental writing Hard_Code.

Thacker is a contributor to The Japan Times Books section, where he has written about the work of Junji Ito, Osamu Dazai, Haruo Sato, Keiji Nishitani, Izumi Kyōka, Edogawa Rampo, and Zen death poetry.

Thacker wrote a column for London-based Mute Magazine called "Occultural Studies," writing about such topics as the Surrealist poet Robert Desnos, Schopenhauer's philosophy, the horror writing of Thomas Ligotti, and the music of And Also The Trees.

Thacker has written Forewords to the English editions of the works of E. M. Cioran, published by Arcade Press. He provided the Preface and Annotations to Clive Barker's 1988 horror novella Cabal, in a special edition published by Fiddleblack Press. Thacker is part of the editorial group of Schism, an underground philosophy and literary press.

Thacker has contributed to limited editions books produced by Zagava Press, including his essay on the life and writings of J.-K. Huysmans. Thacker has also participated in the series of "black metal theory" symposia and publications.

Other activities 

Thacker has also collaborated with artists and musicians. These include the art collective Fakeshop, which presented art & installation at Ars Electronica, ACM SIGGRAPH, and the Whitney Biennial. He has also collaborated with Biotech Hobbyist, and co-authored an art book Creative Biotechnology: A User's Manual. In 1998 Thacker produced a CD of noise music released by Extreme Records and a split CD with Merzbow/Masami Akita, part of the Extreme Records Merzbow Box Set released in 2000.

Influence

In an interview with the Wall Street Journal, Nic Pizzolatto, creator and writer of True Detective, cites Thacker's In the Dust of This Planet as an influence on the TV series, particularly the worldview of lead character Rust Cohle, along with several other books: Ray Brassier's Nihil Unbound, Thomas Ligotti's The Conspiracy Against the Human Race, Jim Crawford's Confessions of an Antinatalist, and David Benatar's Better Never to Have Been.

In September 2014 the WNYC's Radiolab ran a show entitled "In the Dust of This Planet." The program traced the appropriation of Thacker's book of the same name in contemporary art, fashion, music video, and popular culture. Both Thacker's book and the Radiolab podcast were covered by Glenn Beck on TheBlazeTV. Thacker has commented on 'nihilism memes' in an interview: "Is it any accident that at a time when we have become acutely aware of the challenges concerning global climate change, we have also created this bubble of social media? I find social media and media culture generally to be a vapid, desperate, self-aggrandizing circus of species-specific solipsism — ironically, the stupidity of our species might be its only legacy."

Thacker and his book In the Dust of This Planet are referenced by YouTube channel Wisecrack.

Comic book author Warren Ellis cites as an influence the nihilist philosophies of Thacker and Peter Sjöstedt-H for his 2017 series Karnak: The Flaw in All Things, a re-imagining of the original Marvel Inhumans character Karnak.

The writing of Thacker and Thomas Ligotti is cited as an influence on the 2021 album The Nightmare of Being by the Gothenburg melodic death metal band At The Gates; Thacker also provided lyrics for the song "Cosmic Pessimism".

Bibliography

Hard Code: Narrating the Network Society. Edited by Eugene Thacker. Alt-X Press, 2002. .
Biomedia. University of Minnesota Press, 2004. .
Creative Biotechnology: A User's Manual, co-authored with Natalie Jeremijenko and Heath Bunting. Locus+, 2004. .
The Global Genome: Biotechnology, Politics, and Culture. MIT Press, 2005. .
The Exploit: A Theory of Networks, co-authored with Alexander R. Galloway. University of Minnesota Press, 2007. .
After Life. University of Chicago Press, 2010. .
In the Dust of This Planet (Horror of Philosophy Vol. 1). Zero Books, 2011. .
Leper Creativity: The Cyclonopedia Symposium, co-edited with Ed Keller and Nicola Masciandaro. Punctum Books, 2012. .
Excommunication: Three Inquiries in Media and Mediation, co-authored with Alexander R. Galloway and McKenzie Wark. University of Chicago Press, 2013. .
Dark Nights of the Universe, co-authored with Daniel Colucciello Barber, Nicola Masciandaro, Alexander R. Galloway and François Laruelle. [NAME] Publications, 2013. .
And They Were Two in One and One in Two, co-edited with Nicola Masciandaro. Schism Press, 2014. .
Starry Speculative Corpse (Horror of Philosophy Vol. 2). Zero Books, 2015. .
Tentacles Longer Than Night (Horror of Philosophy Vol. 3). Zero Books, 2015. .
Cosmic Pessimism, with drawings by Keith Tilford. Univocal Publishing, 2015. .
Infinite Resignation. Repeater Books, 2018. .
An Ideal for Living: An Anti-Novel (20th Anniversary Edition). Schism Press, 2020. .
Arthur Schopenhauer, On The Suffering Of The World. Edited with an Introduction by Eugene Thacker. Repeater Books, 2020. .
The Repeater Book of the Occult, co-edited with Tariq Goddard. Repeater Books, 2021. .
Songs for Sad Poets, Siavash Amini & Eugene Thacker, Hallow Ground Records, 2022

References

External links 
 
 The New School: Eugene Thacker
 Radiolab - In the Dust of This Planet, Radiolab interview with Eugene Thacker, Simon Critchley, Jad Abumrad, and others, WNYC (September 8, 2014)
 Horror of Philosophy: Three Volumes, Interviewed by Carla Nappi on New Books Network (2015) 
 New Yorker feature (9–16 July 2018)
 VICE interview with Zachary Siegel (8 August 2018)
 The Quietus interview with Michael J. Brooks (October 28, 2018)
 Creative Independent interview with Meredith Graves (November 8, 2018)
 O32c Magazine interview with Daniel Beatty Garcia (July 2019)
 The Patron Saints of Pessimism - A Writer's Pantheon, excerpt from Infinite Resignation @ LitHub (2018)
 Infinite Resignation - a playlist, December 9, 2018
 "Pessimism, Futility, and Extinction" Theory, Culture & Society interview with Thomas Dekeyser (17 March 2020).
 "On Suffering" interview with Brad Evans, Los Angeles Review of Books (February 1, 2021).
 "How Algernon Blackwood Turned Nature Into Sublime Horror" LitHub (2021).

Year of birth missing (living people)
Living people
21st-century American essayists
21st-century American male writers
21st-century American philosophers
21st-century American poets
American literary critics
Aphorists
Mass media theorists
Philosophers of technology
Philosophers of nihilism
Philosophers of pessimism
Rutgers University alumni
The New School faculty
University of Washington alumni